Nogometni klub Olimpija Ljubljana, commonly referred to as Olimpija Ljubljana or simply Olimpija, is a professional football club, based in the city of Ljubljana, Slovenia. The club competes in the Slovenian PrvaLiga, the country's highest football division.

Founded on 2 March 2005, under the name NK Bežigrad, Olimpija began competing in the Slovenian fifth division during the 2005–06 season and managed to achieve promotion in four successive seasons, reaching the top division for the first time in 2009 after winning the 2008–09 Slovenian Second League. After seven years in the top division, Olimpija won their first major trophy when they were crowned champions in the 2015–16 season. They won another league title in the 2017–18 season; the same season, Olimpija also won the national cup, completing their first double.

Initially, the club played at the Bežigrad Stadium and the ŽAK Stadium during the club's stay in the second division and during the first year in the top division. In 2010, they moved to the Stožice Stadium with a capacity of 16,038.

Olimpija's nicknames are the "Green and Whites", referring to their primary colours, and "The Dragons", referring to the dragon which is a symbol of Ljubljana and is represented on the city's coat of arms and on the club's crest.

History

Foundation

Olimpija Ljubljana was founded on 2 March 2005 as NK Bežigrad, and was renamed NK Olimpija Bežigrad during their third season of existence. The club was renamed again to ŠD NK Olimpija Ljubljana on 3 March 2008 after being granted the rights by the administrative unit of the City Municipality of Ljubljana. The club regard themselves as the continuation of the four-times Slovenian Champions Olimpija, who went bankrupt and were dissolved following the 2004–05 season. Legally, Olimpija Ljubljana is distinct and separate club and treated as such by the Football Association of Slovenia.

Because of their association with the dissolved club, Olimpija Ljubljana was criticised on numerous occasions by several media outlets in the country, which questioned the legitimacy of their actions and even the fact that the club has a year 1911 inscribed on their crest. They were also criticised by ND Ilirija 1911. In 2013, the Financial Administration of the Republic of Slovenia publicly disclosed the list of tax debtors in the country and among those was also NK Olimpija Ljubljana, with a tax debt between €100,000 and €300,000. The next day, Olimpija Ljubljana's officials made a public statement where they confirmed that the club in question (i.e. dissolved Olimpija) is a different legal entity and is not, by any means, connected with Olimpija Ljubljana which does not have any financial obligations to the state or any third parties.

Early years (2005–2009)

Assisted by semi-retired club legends of the old Olimpija and other notable Slovenian players, the club started to compete in the lowest tier of Slovenian football and won the fifth division in their first year. In the next two seasons, Bežigrad was promoted to the Slovenian Second League, by winning both fourth and third divisions in consecutive seasons. During their season in the fourth division the club changed its name for the first time and became known as Olimpija Bežigrad. This happened despite the claims of Joc Pečečnik, one of the wealthiest man in Slovenia and, at the time, owner of NK Interblock, that he is in fact the sole owner of the Olimpija name and brand. During the 2008–09 season, the club changed their name once again, this time to Olimpija Ljubljana. In the same season, the club won the second division title and earned a promotion to the Slovenian top division. Throughout the path to the top division, Olimpija was supported by Green Dragons, the fan group of the dissolved Olimpija. The success of the club, who earned a promotion from the fifth division to top division in only four seasons, was somewhat dented by a conflict between several players, coaching staff, club leadership and sponsors, which eventually led to a player-led boycott in the final round of the 2008–09 second division season. Due to this event, the club began their first season in Slovenian top flight (2009–10) with a two points deduction. In addition, several notable players, including Miran Pavlin and Amir Karić, left the club.

Promotion to Slovenian top division (2009–2015)
For their first ever 1. SNL campaign, several players were signed to replace the recent departures, along with a new coach, Branko Oblak. The club had a poor start, as the team, mainly composed of young players and a small number of veterans, only managed one win in the opening four matches. After their defeat against Maribor on 8 August 2009, the club announced that Oblak had agreed to terminate his contract, with assistant manager Safet Hadžić taking his place as caretaker. The club's fortunes soon turned result-wise and Robert Pevnik was hired to take over as manager. The club finished the season in fourth place.

In the run up to the 2010–11 season, principal sponsor Izet Rastoder was elected president and Safet Hadžić took over as manager. The season started poorly, with a 5–0 aggregate defeat against Široki Brijeg in the UEFA Europa League qualifying round. This game was later alleged by German television station ARD to have been fixed. It was later revealed that UEFA officially investigated the match and that three players of Olimpija were under investigation. After another poor start which saw the club only manage two points in five matches, manager Safet Hadžić and director of football Simon Sešlar both left in August 2010. Dušan Kosič then took over as manager with Aleš Čeh as his assistant. On 26 January 2011, former Slovenian international Milenko Ačimovič became the director of football. After a poor start into the season, the new director of football brought a couple of players with international experiences, among which was also a midfielder Dare Vršič. During the second phase of the Slovenian championship the team started to show their potential and eventually finished their second 1. SNL season in fourth place, securing a place in the 2011–12 UEFA Europa League qualifications. With the 3–0 home victory against Široki Brijeg on 7 July 2011, Olimpija achieved its first victory in UEFA competitions. In addition, it was the first international club match played at the Stožice Stadium, opened in August 2010. During the 2011–12 Slovenian PrvaLiga season, the club finished as a runner-up behind Maribor.

National champions (2015 to present)
In June 2015, Milan Mandarić, a Serbian-American business tycoon, took over the club. In his first season, the club won the Slovenian League title for the first time. During the 2017–18 season, Olimpija won the double after winning the league title over Maribor with the same number of points, but with a better head-to-head record, and winning the national cup after defeating Aluminij 6–1 in the final.

Name changes
NK Bežigrad (2005–2007)
NK Olimpija Bežigrad (2007–2008)
NK Olimpija Ljubljana (2008–present)

Club colours and kits

Since the club's foundation, Olimpija has been playing in the combination of green and white, which were also the main colours of the dissolved Olimpija. Today, the club plays in green kits at home and in white kits away. The third kit is usually black or grey. Since June 2022, the kit manufacturer is Puma.

Stadium

Stožice Stadium is a football stadium located in Ljubljana with a capacity of 16,038 covered seats. It was designed by the Sadar + Vuga architecture bureau and is the biggest Slovenian football stadium. It opened in August 2010 and lies in the Bežigrad district, north of the city centre. Together with an indoor arena, it is a part of the Stožice Sports Park. The stadium also has 558 VIP seats and 97 spots for persons with disabilities. Olimpija played its first match at the new stadium on 22 August 2010, in front of 7,000 spectators in a league match against Koper. The record home attendance was set in 2014, when 15,972 spectators gathered to watch Olimpija play against English Premier League side Chelsea in a friendly match. The stadium is also used as the main venue for home matches of the Slovenia national football team, as well as for many cultural events such as music concerts.

Supporters 

Olimpija's main supporters are called Green Dragons, one of the two largest ultras groups in the country, who also supported the old Olimpija until the club's dissolution in 2005 and went over to the new club in the same year, as they regard it as a successor of the original club. They mostly wear green and white symbols and clothing, which are the club's colours.

Rivalry

Olimpija's biggest rivalry is with NK Maribor, against whom they contest the Eternal derby. The original Eternal derby was contested by Maribor and Olimpija (which folded and was dissolved in 2005) and today the continuation of the rivalry is considered as the matches between Maribor and Olimpija, established in 2005 as NK Bežigrad. The rivalry traced its roots back to the early 1960s and the time of Yugoslavia when the first match between the two clubs was played. The two teams represented the two largest cities in Slovenia, the capital city of Ljubljana and the second largest city Maribor, and both teams always had one of the largest fan bases in the country. Traditionally Ljubljana represents the richer western part of the country while Maribor is the center of the poorer eastern part. In addition, Ljubljana was always the cultural, educational, economic and political center of the country and Olimpija and its fans were considered as the representatives of the upper class. Maribor, on the other hand, was one of the most industrialized cities in Yugoslavia and the majority of its fans were the representatives of the working class, which means that the added tension to the rivalry was usually political, social and cultural as well. The old rivalry reached its peak in the final round of 2000–01 season when one of the most celebrated matches in Slovenian League history was played, when Olimpija met Maribor at their home stadium, Bežigrad. Both teams were competing for their fifth national league title. Olimpija needed a win for the title, while a draw was enough for Maribor. The atmosphere was electric days before the kick-off and the stadium with the capacity of 8,500 was completely sold out. At the end, the match ended with a draw (1–1) and Maribor started to celebrate their fifth consecutive title.

The additional intensity to the rivalry is the fact that both Maribor and Olimpija always had support on their matches from ultras groups called Viole Maribor, supporting Maribor, and Green Dragons, who supports Olimpija. The two groups are the largest in the country and it is not uncommon that the matches between the two clubs were sometimes interrupted by violent clashes between the two groups or with the police. On many occasions, before or after the matches, the fans of the two clubs would also meet up and fight on the streets. One of the worst incidents, in April 2010 after a match, resulted in a stabbing of a member of the Green Dragons who, with a group of friends, got into a fight with members of the Viole in Ljubljana's railway station. However, to date, there has not been any fatalities in the country related to football violence. Because the new Olimpija is supported by most of the fans of the previous Olimpija, many see the matches between Maribor and the new club as the continuation of the rivalry and refer to it by the same name. The first match between Maribor and the new Olimpija took place on 24 October 2007 in a Slovenian Cup quarter-final match that was won by Maribor, 3–1. At the time Olimpija was still competing under the name Olimpija Bežigrad. Overall, Maribor has been the team with more success in head-to-head matches.

Squad

Current squad
As of 18 February 2023

Honours

League
Slovenian First League
Winners: 2015–16, 2017–18
Runners-up: 2011–12, 2012–13, 2018–19
Slovenian Second League
Winners: 2008–09
Slovenian Third League
Winners: 2007–08 (west)
Ljubljana Regional League (fourth tier)
Winners: 2006–07
Slovenian Fifth Division
Winners: 2005–06

Cup
Slovenian Cup
Winners: 2017–18, 2018–19, 2020–21
Runners-up: 2016–17
Slovenian Supercup
Runners-up: 2012, 2013
MNZ Ljubljana Cup
Runners-up: 2006–07, 2008–09

Season-by-season record

Key

League
P = Matches played
W = Matches won
D = Matches drawn
L = Matches lost
F = Goals for
A = Goals against
Pts = Points won
Pos = Final position

Slovenia
Div 1 = Slovenian PrvaLiga
Div 2 = Slovenian Second League
Div 3 = Slovenian Third League (West)
Div 4 = Slovenian Fourth League (Ljubljana)
Div 5 = Slovenian Fifth League
Cup = Slovenian Cup
Supercup = Slovenian Supercup

Cup / Europe
N/A = Was not held
— = Did not compete
QR = Qualifying round
PR = Play-off round
R16 = Round of 16
QF = Quarter-final
SF = Semi-final
F = Final/Runner-up
W = Competition won

|-
!scope=row style=text-align:center|2005–06
|bgcolor="#DDFFDD"|Div 5 ↑
|17
|16
|
|
|82
|
|49
|bgcolor="gold"| 
|
|N/A
|
|
|
|17
|-
!scope=row style=text-align:center|2006–07
|bgcolor="#DDFFDD"|Div 4 ↑
|22
|19
|
|
|91
|13
|60
|bgcolor="gold"| 
|
|N/A
|
|
|  
|24
|-
!scope=row style=text-align:center|2007–08
|bgcolor="#DDFFDD"|Div 3 ↑
|24
|20
|
|
|79
|13
|63
|bgcolor="gold"| 
|QF
|
|
|
|
|16
|-
!scope=row style=text-align:center|2008–09
|bgcolor="#DDFFDD"|Div 2 ↑
|26
|17
|
|
|69
|25
|56
|bgcolor="gold"| 
|R16
|
|
|
|
|15
|-
!scope=row style=text-align:center|2009–10
|Div 1
|36
|16
|
|13
|51
|33
|53
|
|R16
|
|
|
|
|
|-
!scope=row style=text-align:center|2010–11
|Div 1
|36
|15
|10
|11
|59
|43
|55
|
|QF
|
|UEFA Europa League
|QR
| 
|
|-
!scope=row style=text-align:center|2011–12
|Div 1
|36
|19
|
|
|60
|38
|65
|bgcolor="silver"| 
|R16
|
|UEFA Europa League
|QR
|
|27
|-
!scope=row style=text-align:center|2012–13
|Div 1
|36
|21
|
|
|73
|35
|70
|bgcolor="silver"| 
|QF
|bgcolor="silver"|F 
|UEFA Europa League
|QR
|
|16
|-
!scope=row style=text-align:center|2013–14
|Div 1
|36
|12
|
|18
|38
|56
|42
|
|SF
|bgcolor="silver"|F 
|UEFA Europa League
|QR
|
|10
|-
!scope=row style=text-align:center|2014–15
|Div 1
|36
|17
|10
|
|55
|32
|61
|
|QF
|
|
|
|
|13
|-
!scope=row style=text-align:center|2015–16
|Div 1
|36
|22
|
|
|75
|25
|74
|bgcolor="gold"| 
|QF
|
|
|
|
|17
|-
!scope=row style=text-align:center|2016–17
|Div 1
|36
|17
|
|10
|49
|35
|60
|
|bgcolor="silver"|F 
|N/A
|UEFA Champions League
|QR
|
|14
|-
!scope=row style=text-align:center|2017–18
|Div 1
|36
|23
|11
|
|61
|17
|80
|bgcolor="gold"| 
|bgcolor="gold"|W 
|N/A
|UEFA Europa League
|QR
|
|12
|-
!scope=row style=text-align:center|2018–19
|Div 1
|36
|20
|
|
|73
|47
|69
|bgcolor="silver"| 
|bgcolor="gold"|W 
|N/A
|UEFA Champions LeagueUEFA Europa League
|QRPR
|
|21
|-
!scope=row style=text-align:center|2019–20
|Div 1
|36
|20
|
|
|73
|44
|67
|
|R16
|N/A
|UEFA Europa League
|QR
|
|27
|-
!scope=row style=text-align:center|2020–21
|Div 1
|36
|16
|
|
|45
|35
|59
|
|bgcolor="gold"|W 
|N/A
|UEFA Europa League
|QR
|
|14
|-
!scope=row style=text-align:center|2021–22
|Div 1
|36
|18
|
|
|53
|38
|62
|
|QF
|N/A
|UEFA Conference League
|QR
|
|13
|}

Timeline

European campaigns

UEFA club competition record
As of 28 July 2022

Matches
All results (home and away) list Olimpija's goal tally first.

Notes
 1QR: First qualifying round
 2QR: Second qualifying round
 3QR: Third qualifying round
 PO: Play-off round

Personnel

Management
Last updated: 11 August 2022

Current technical staff
Last updated: 4 July 2022

List of head coaches

References
General

Specific

External links

 
Green dragons – Supporters 
PrvaLiga profile 
UEFA profile

 
Association football clubs established in 2005
Football clubs in Slovenia
Football clubs in Ljubljana
2005 establishments in Slovenia
Unrelegated association football clubs